Heinsberg is an electoral constituency (German: Wahlkreis) represented in the Bundestag. It elects one member via first-past-the-post voting. Under the current constituency numbering system, it is designated as constituency 89. It is located in western North Rhine-Westphalia, comprising the Heinsberg district.

Heinsberg was created for the inaugural 1949 federal election. Since 2013, it has been represented by Wilfried Oellers of the Christian Democratic Union (CDU).

Geography
Heinsberg is located in western North Rhine-Westphalia. As of the 2021 federal election, it is coterminous with the Heinsberg district.

History
Heinsberg was created in 1949, then known as Geilenkirchen – Erkelenz – Jülich. In the 1965 and 1969 elections, it was named Geilenkirchen – Heinsberg. It acquired its current name in the 1972 election. In the 1949 election, it was North Rhine-Westphalia constituency 3 in the numbering system. In the 1953 through 1961 elections, it was number 62. From 1965 through 1998, it was number 55. From 2002 through 2009, it was number 90. Since the 2013 election, it has been number 89.

Originally, the constituency comprised the districts of Geilenkirchen-Heinsberg, Erkelenz, and Jülich. In the 1965 and 1969 elections, it comprised the districts of Geilenkirchen and Heinsberg. In the 1972 election, it was coterminous with Heinsberg district. In the 1976 election, it also contained the municipality of Niederkrüchten from the Viersen district. It acquired its current borders in the 1980 election.

Members
The constituency has been held continuously by the Christian Democratic Union (CDU) since its creation. It was first represented by Karl Müller from 1949 to 1957, followed by Karl Arnold for a single term. Fritz Burgbacher was elected in 1961 and served until 1972. Adolf Freiherr Spies von Büllesheim served until 1987, followed by Karl H. Fell until 1998. Leo Dautzenberg was elected in the 1998 election and served until 2013. Wilfried Oellers was elected in 2013, and re-elected in 2017 and 2021.

Election results

2021 election

2017 election

2013 election

2009 election

References

Federal electoral districts in North Rhine-Westphalia
Heinsberg (district)
1949 establishments in West Germany
Constituencies established in 1949